Consort Qi (224 – 194 BC), also known as Lady Qi, was a consort of Emperor Gaozu, founder of the Han dynasty.

Biography

Qi was born in Dingtao, Shandong. She bore Emperor Gaozu a son Liu Ruyi, who was later installed as Prince of Zhao. Gaozu felt that the crown prince Liu Ying (his second son) was an unsuitable heir to his throne. He tried several times, fruitlessly, to replace Liu Ying with Liu Ruyi, as his desire was objected to by Liu Ying's mother Empress Lü Zhi. Because of this, Lü Zhi hated Qi deeply. Nevertheless, Gaozu ordered Liu Ruyi to proceed to his principality of Zhao (capital in present-day Handan, Hebei) on his deathbed. Qi did not accompany Liu Ruyi.

Lü Zhi, now declared the empress dowager when her son Liu Ying succeeded to the throne as Emperor Hui after Gaozu's death, commenced an inhumane plot against Qi and Liu Ruyi. She first had Qi arrested and treated her like a convict (dressed in prison garb, head shaved, and in stocks). She then summoned Liu Ruyi to the capital Chang'an in an attempt that was initially resisted by Liu Ruyi's chief of staff Zhou Chang (周昌), whom she respected because he was one of the officials who insisted on Liu Ying being the rightful heir. Instead of directly moving against Zhou Chang and Liu Ruyi, Lü Zhi circumvented Zhou by first summoning him to Chang'an, and then summoning Liu Ruyi. She then consummated her plot to put Qi and Liu Ruyi to death, which was documented in Volume 9 of the historical text Records of the Grand Historian as follows:

Emperor Xiaohui (Liu Ying, Emperor Hui of Han) kept his step-brother King of Zhao (Liu Ruyi，King Yin of Zhao) by his side in the palace and checked for poison in any aliment delivered to him. Emperor Xiaohui also brought Liu Ruyi with him wherever he went. In one early morning in the twelfth month of the first year of Emperor Xiaohui, the emperor went on a hunting trip; this time King of Zhao was left alone because he could not wake up early. Emperor Xiaohui supposed his mother would not plot against King of Zhao as several months had passed without any occurrence. Nevertheless, Empress Dowager had an assassin force venom down King of Zhao's throat...When the Emperor came back, Liu Ruyi was already dead. She then had Concubine Qi's limbs chopped off, blinded her by gouging out her eyes, cut off her tongue, cut off her nose, cut off her ears, forced her to drink a potion that made her mute, made her dumb with toxins, and locked her in the pigsty, and called her a "human swine" (人彘). Several days after, Emperor Xiaohui saw the "human swine", and after realising who the "human swine" was, the emperor was so sick of his mother's cruelty that he virtually relinquished his authority and indulged in carnal pleasures.

Both Qi and her son died in the first year of Emperor Hui's reign.

Connection to the game of weiqi 

According to Xijing Zaji (西京雜記) by Hong Ge, Qi had a maid named Jia Peilan (賈佩蘭) who escaped and later married to a commoner named Duan Ru (段儒) from Fufeng Prefecture (west of present-day Xi'an, Shaanxi). She described Qi as a very beautiful woman, a great songwriter and weiqi player. On the fourth day of the eighth lunar month every year, Qi would play a weiqi game with Emperor Gaozu in the bamboo forest on the north side of the palace. The winner would make a wish that they believed to come true, while the loser would suffer from illness for the year; however loser can avoid this bad luck by cutting off a strand of hair and praying to the North Star.

Qi won every year and wished for good fortune for the Han dynasty.

Jia Peilan is credited in passing out Han dynasty court customs of Double Ninth Festival to commoners.

References

 Sima Qian. Records of the Grand Historian.

224 BC births
194 BC deaths
Han dynasty imperial consorts
3rd-century BC Chinese women
3rd-century BC Chinese people
2nd-century BC Chinese women
2nd-century BC Chinese people
Year of birth unknown
Torture victims
Emperor Gaozu of Han
Toilet goddesses
Chinese concubines
3rd-century BC Chinese women writers
3rd-century BC Chinese writers